Susie's New Shoes is a lost 1914 silent short film directed by and starring Harry A. Pollard and his wife Margarita Fischer. It was produced by the American Film Manufacturing Company and released by Mutual Film.

Cast
Margarita Fischer - Suzanna Van Dusen
Harry A. Pollard - William Van Dusen
Joe Harris - Fake Blind Man (*or Joseph Harris)
Fred Gamble - Policeman
Mary Scott - Mrs. Riley

References

External links
 Susie's New Shoes at IMDb.com

1914 films
Lost American films
American black-and-white films
Films directed by Harry A. Pollard
Mutual Film films
Silent American comedy-drama films
1914 comedy-drama films
1914 lost films
Lost comedy-drama films
1910s American films
1914 short films
American short films
Comedy-drama short films